The Yount Monument is a public art work by artist Brian Maughan.  It is located in front of the Miller Park stadium west of downtown Milwaukee, Wisconsin. The sculpture depicts Robin Yount, a member of the Milwaukee Brewers baseball team, following through after taking a swing at a pitch. The figure wears a 1980s-style uniform with close-fitting calf-length pants, a button-front short-sleeved jersey and a batting helmet. The sculpture was dedicated on April 5, 2001.

References

2001 establishments in Wisconsin
2001 sculptures
Baseball culture
Bronze sculptures in Wisconsin
Cultural depictions of baseball players
Monuments and memorials in Wisconsin
Outdoor sculptures in Milwaukee
Sculptures of men in Wisconsin
Sculptures of sports
Statues in Wisconsin
Statues of sportspeople